Death Metal Finland is the debut from Finnish death metal band Sotajumala.  It was released on Woodcut Records in 2004.  The songs are mostly written (in Finnish) by the instrumentalists themselves (much as in the case of Cannibal Corpse, one of their avowed influences), as vocalist 105 (aka Teijo Hakkola) only figures into the songwriting on one track.

Track listing
All Songs Arranged By Sotajumala.
 Intro 0:52
 Meidän Maa (Our Land) (Jyri Haakinen, Kosti Orbinski, Tomi "Aake" Otsala) 2:50
 Elämän Vihollinen (Enemy of Life) (Hakkinen, Orbinski, Otsala, "Suhonen") 3:38
 Syyttömien Veri (Blood of the Innocent) (Orbinski, Otsala) 2:42
 Kuolleet (The Dead) (Arttu Romo, Orbinski, Otsala) 4:49
 Rakkaudesta Sotaan (For the Love of War) (Orbinski, Otsala, Teijo Hakkola) 1:52
 Panssarikolonna (Panzer Division) (Hakkinen, Orbinski, Otsala, Romo) 2:15
 Sisu Sinivalkoinen (Blue-and-White Strength) (Hakkinen, Orbinski, Otsala, Pete Lapio) 2:45
 Sotajumala (Wargod) (Orbinski, Otsala, Romo) 2:09
 Vanki (The Prisoner) (Orbinski, Otsala, Romo) 3:59
 Pommitus (Air Raid) (Orbinski, Otsala, Romo) 5:38

Personnel

Sotajumala
105 (aka Teijo Hakkola): Vocals
Kosti Orbinski: Lead & Rhythm Guitars
Pete Lapio: Lead & Rhythm Guitars
Tomi Otsala: Bass
Timo Hakkinen: Drums

Additional musicians
Simo "Slayer" Rahikainen: Guest Lead on "Kuolleet"
Sami Kokko: Guest Vocals on "Pommitus"

Production
Produced By Juha Saikkonen
Recorded, Engineered & Mixed By Sami Kokko (Sam's Workshop, Jyväskylä)
Mastered By Mika Jussila (Finnvox Studios, Helsinki)

External links
Sotajumala release page; lists recording dates and info

2003 albums
Sotajumala albums